Transfesa (Transportes Ferroviarios Especiales S.A.) is a transport company based in Madrid, Spain.

History
Transfesa was founded in 1943.

Company description
Transfesa it is a transport and logistics service provider and European intermodal operator.

As of 2007 The company has five major terminals in Spain at Madrid, Barcelona, Valencia, Saragossa and Burgos, and ten intermodal (road rail) logistics facilities. The company's transportation fleet includes over 7000 railway wagons, over 2000 swap bodies and over 200 trucks.

The company also operates two rail gauge changing facilities on the France/Spain border.

In August 2007 Deutsche Bahn acquired a majority stake in the company. The takeover was approved in 2008, with Deutsche Bahn acquiring 55.1% of the company for €135million. RENFE and SNCF are minority shareholders.

In 2022, its shares were distributed between Deutsche Bahn Ibérica Holding (70.29%), Renfe (20.35%), treasury stock (9.11%) and minority shareholders (0.24%).

References

External links

Official Website
Mototrans Website

Companies based in Madrid
Railway companies of Spain
Transport companies of Spain
Logistics companies of Spain
Deutsche Bahn
Transport companies established in 1943
Spanish companies established in 1943
Railway companies established in 1943